Estadio Olímpico de la UCV is a multipurpose stadium (football, athletics, rugby) used mainly for association football in Caracas, Venezuela, which serves the home ground of Caracas F.C., Deportivo La Guaira, Metropolitanos F.C., and Universidad Central. It has a capacity of 23,940.

History

The stadium was designed by Venezuelan architect Carlos Raúl Villanueva.  It was opened in 1951 and renovated in 2007. It used to be the home ground of Unión S.C.

The stadium has hosted major events such as the Copa Libertadores, the 1983 Pan American Games and the South American qualifiers for the World Cup, as well as the former Copa Merconorte and matches of the Copa América. 

There have been several important football teams that have played at this stadium, such as Inter Milan, A.C. Milan, Real Madrid, USSR, Argentina and Brazil. 

The 1975 Copa América final between Peru and Colombia was also played in this stadium.

In 2009, Aerosmith was to be the first act playing at Estadio Olímpico. The concert was cancelled due to a knee infection to lead guitarist Joe Perry.

Copa América matches

1975 Copa América
The Olímpico was the venue for the 1975 Copa América play-off final:

2007 Copa América
The stadium was one of the venues for the 2007 Copa América. The following games were played at the stadium during said event:

References

External links

Olimpico
Olimpico
Copa América stadiums
Multi-purpose stadiums in Venezuela
Sports venues in Caracas
Pan American Games opening ceremony stadiums
1950 establishments in Venezuela
Ciudad Universitaria de Caracas
Rugby union stadiums in Venezuela